Press and Hold is the third extended play by Australian punk rock band One Dollar Short. It was released in August 2001 and peaked at number 23 on the ARIA Charts.

Track listing 
 "Satellite" – 3:40
 "Robot" – 3:23
 "Fingerprints" – 3:17
 "Here I Am" – 3:24
 "Pinball Arcade" – 2:36

Charts

Release history

References

2001 EPs
EPs by Australian artists
One Dollar Short albums
Indie pop EPs
Synth-pop EPs